Adam Thomas Smith is Distinguished Professor of Arts and Sciences in Anthropology at Cornell University. He is also co-founder (with Ruben Badalyan) of The American-Armenian Project for the Archaeology and Geography of Ancient Transcaucasian Societies (Project ArAGATS) and co-director (with Lori Khatchadourian) of The Aragats Foundation. He is a co-director (with Lori Khatchadourian and Ian Lindsay of Caucasus Heritage Watch, a research group monitoring cultural heritage in the South Caucasus in the wake of the 2020 Nagorno-Karabakh war. In 2021, Smith and Khatchadourian joined with Gerard Aching to launch a community excavation program at the St. James AME Zion Church in Ithaca NY, the oldest active AME Zion church in the world.

Smith received an A.B. from Brown University in 1990, an M.Phil. from Cambridge University 1991, and an A.M. and Ph.D. from the University of Arizona in 1993 and 1996. He was then a member of the University of Michigan's Society of Fellows from 1997-2000 before joining the Department of Anthropology at the University of Chicago. In the Fall of 2011, Smith joined the faculty of the Cornell University's Department of Anthropology where he served as Department Chairperson from 2014-2017.

Smith's research is dedicated to the archaeology and anthropology of the South Caucasus, particularly the area of modern Armenia, where most of his work has been focused His work investigates "the role that the material world—everyday objects, representational media, natural and built landscapes—plays in our political lives".

Smith is a winner of a 2010 Guggenheim Fellowship.

Books

 (with Laura M. Popova and Charles W. Hartley)
 (with David L. Peterson and Laura M. Popova)

References

External links
 CV and Works
 Faculty Profile
https://www.researchgate.net/profile/Adam_Smith58

American archaeologists
American anthropologists
University of Arizona alumni
University of Chicago faculty
Cornell University faculty
Living people
Alumni of the University of Cambridge
Year of birth missing (living people)
Brown University alumni